Isonotholaenic acid is a dihydrostilbenoid found in the Andean fern Argyrochosma nivea (formerly Notholaena nivea). This compound shows an anti-chagasic activity.

References 

Dihydrostilbenoids